Paul Nyirjesy is a professor in the Department of Obstetrics and Gynecology at Drexel University, Philadelphia, and the director of Drexel Vaginitis Center. In 2016, Nyirjesy announced positive results from a clinical trial for a potential vaccine against Vaginitis.

Education
He received his BA in chemistry, magna cum laude, from Amherst College in 1981. He received his MD, Alpha Omega Alpha, from Georgetown University School of Medicine in 1985. He did his residency in obstetrics and gynecology at the Thomas Jefferson University and a fellowship in infectious disease at Temple University Hospital.

Awards and honors
First in 1998, and then annually since 2003, he has been listed as part of the Best Doctors in America. Philadelphia magazine listed his center, the Drexel Vaginitis Center, as the Best Places for Care of 2008. In 2010 he received the Drexel University College of Medicine ob/gyn faculty resident teaching award. In 2011, he was selected to U.S. News & World Report in their Top Doctors list. Starting in 200 and then in 2002, and annually since 2005, he was named "Top Doc" by Philadelphia magazine.

Publications
Some of his more recent publications and presentations are included in this list.

Chronic Cervicitis: Presenting Features and Response to Therapy. Mattson SK, Polk JP, Nyirjesy P; J Low Genit Tract Dis. 2016-07-01.
Non-albicans Candida Vulvovaginitis: Treatment Experience at a Tertiary Care Vaginitis Center. Powell AM, Gracely E, Nyirjesy P; J Low Genit Tract Dis. 2016-01-01.
A Review of Evidence-Based Care of Symptomatic Trichomoniasis and Asymptomatic Trichomonas vaginalis Infections. Meites, E.,Gaydos, C. A.,Hobbs, M. M.,Kissinger, P.,Nyirjesy, P.,Schwebke, J. R.,Secor, W. E.,Sobel, J. D.,Workowski, K. A.; Clin. Infect. Dis.. 2015 Nov 26.

References

External links
 Interview with Dr. Nyirjesy

Living people
Year of birth missing (living people)
American obstetricians
Drexel University faculty